Kamikita (written: 上北 or 神北) is a Japanese surname. Notable people with the surname include:

Futago Kamikita, twin Japanese manga artists,  and 

Fictional characters:
, character in the visual novel Little Busters!

See also
, district in Aomori Prefecture, Japan
, former town in Aomori Prefecture, Japan
, an expressway in Aomori Prefecture, Japan

Japanese-language surnames